At least two ships of the Royal Norwegian Navy have been named HNoMS Svenner, after the island of Svenner:

, an S-class destroyer acquired from the Royal Navy in 1944 and also sunk in 1944.
, a  commissioned in 1967 and transferred to Poland in 2003.

Royal Norwegian Navy ship names